Entaha al Mushwar is the seventeenth album by Kathem Al Saher, released on November 1, 2005.

Track listing

External links
Kazem Al-Saher: Entaha al Mushwar album at shamra.com

2005 albums
Arabic-language albums
Kadim Al Sahir albums
Rotana Records albums